Liggett and Myers Tobacco Company is a historic factory building located at Huntington, Cabell County, West Virginia, USA. At the rear of the building is an addition built in 1920. Also on the property is the redrying plant, built in 1910. It is a long, one story brick industrial building with a gable roof. The complex was built by the Liggett & Myers Tobacco Company as a tobacco warehouse and cigarette factory.

It was listed on the National Register of Historic Places in 1998.

References

Industrial buildings completed in 1917
Buildings and structures in Huntington, West Virginia
Buildings designated early commercial in the National Register of Historic Places in West Virginia
Industrial buildings and structures on the National Register of Historic Places in West Virginia
National Register of Historic Places in Cabell County, West Virginia
Warehouses on the National Register of Historic Places
Tobacco buildings in the United States
Liggett Group